Pomposa is a monotypic genus of phasmids belonging to the tribe Necrosciini. The only species is Pomposa moesta from Sabah.

References

Lonchodidae